Ailís Ní Ríain (born 15 June 1974) is an Irish composer and playwright.

Music
Born in Cork, Ireland. Ní Ríain is a deaf/hard of hearing female composer who was formally trained in classical music as a composer and pianist. She was awarded the Paul Hamlyn Award for Composers in November 2016. Ailís studied at The Royal Northern College of Music, Manchester University, the University of York and University College Cork. Her music has been broadcast on BBC Radio 3, RTÉ and BBC Radio 4 and performed in Europe, Israel, Brazil and the United States.

As a pianist she has an interest in extended piano techniques, prepared piano and piano alterations. She has been a Fellow at the Ragdale Foundation, Illinois, USA, Virginia Center for the Arts, the Irish Cultural Centre in Paris and the Atlantic Center for the Arts in Florida.

She is represented by the Contemporary Music Centre, Dublin. The British Music Collection also holds a selection of her musical work.

Writing
Ní Ríain's literary work is published by Bloomsbury and Nick Hern Books. She was awarded the Tom Erhardt Award, Peggy Ramsay Foundation Award and short-listed for the James Tait Black Award. Her first play, BEATEN, premiered in Liverpool and Glasgow in 2007. It has since been produced in Germany, Sweden, Ireland and London.

Desolate Heaven was first produced by Theatre503, London in 2013 and published by Methuen Drama. Subsequent production at the Everyman Palace Theatre in Cork, Ireland.   

The Tallest Man in the World was premiered by Corcadorca Theatre Company [Ireland, 2014] and shortlisted for the Eugene O'Neill Playwright's Conference, USA. The American premiere of The Tallest Man in the World took place at The Tank Theater, New York in 2019. Ní Ríain's writing has been translated into French, German and Swedish. Her work in French translation is represented by L'Arche, France.

Music works

Solo
 I will see if I can see/Feicfidh mé má thig liom feicsin (2022)
 Mascaron (2022)
 Hiding Out 'neath the Everything (2021)
 Deargshúileach (2021)
 Tick (2020)
 Our First Lesson in Forgetting (2019)
 Anomaly (2019) 
 The Height of Me (2018)
 Soberado (2017)
 Sklonište (2016)
 Linger (2015)
 Not About Heroes (2014)
 When I die, you can do what you want (2014)
 Treasured (2012)
 Beautiful Cracked Eyes (2008)
 Surrealist Pilgrims (2007)
 Into the Sea of Waking Dreams ... (2007)
 2 Steep 4 Sheep (some hills are) (2006)
 The Falling (2005)
 Fwd: [no subject] (2003)
 Rude Boy (2002)
 Flat-Footed-Former-Flyer (2002)
 Dogs in Waiting (1999)

Duos
 Sour Morning Crimson (2020)
 Highfalutin (2017)
 Consent #7  (2017)
 The Consequences of Falling (2013)
 Chainstitchembroidered (2012)
 Quantitas Speaks (2012) 
 End with Words of Hope (2010)
 Brief-Blue-Electric-Bloom (2010)
 10,000 Deviants (2007)
 FIRST ABSOLUTE EXECUTION (2004)
 DON'T! (2000)
 The Man Made of Rain (1999)
 Mercury (1997)
 Down the Rabbit Hole (1994)

Trios
 Soundless (2016)
 Reinventions (2010)
 UPTHEWALLS (2007)
 Rogue Boar Shot Dead (2007)
 The Last Time I Died ... (2002)
 Under the Rose ... (2000)

Quartets
 Wait (2020)
 Dubinina’s Tongue (2015)

Quintets and sextets
 Revelling/Reckoning (2021)
 Treasured Suite (2012)
 Orizzontale (1997)

Larger ensembles
 Flower Scar Road (2021)
 METRO (2001)

Music theatre
 Break Down De Doom (2017) [text. Mac Wellman]
 I Used to Feel ... (2016) [text. Ní Ríain]
 Brief-Blue-Electric-Bloom (2010) [text. Ní Ríain]
 The Falling (2005) [text. Ní Ríain]

Vocal
 Watershed (2020)
 A Crow’s Wisp/Sop Préacháin (2019)
 Song of Letters (2016)
 Cimmerian (2015) [text. Ní Ríain]
 Eyeless (2012) [text. Ní Ríain]
 In Sleep ... (2010) [text. Ní Ríain]
 Valley of Stone (2008)
 Spurious Balancing (2003) [text. Ní Ríain]
 Attrition (2001)
 A Song for My Body (1998)
 Two Songs for any voice (1995/6)

Music installation
 East:West - Where Morning is the Sea (2020)
 No Other Word For It (2019)
 Linger (2015/16)
 Intone (2013)
 Taken (2011-2012)
 Boy You Turn Me (2011)
 Pulse Prelude (2011)
 Down (2010)
 Conversations We Wish We'd Had (2010)
 Lighthouse Lullaby (2009)
 Stones (2008)
 StreetSong (2007)
 Missing Persons (2006)

Residencies and Fellowships
 Yaddo, New York, USA
 Centre Culturel Irlandais in Paris, France
 Ragdale, Illinois, USA
 Bogliasco Foundation, Italy
 Virginia Center for the Creative Arts, USA
 OMI International, New York, USA
 The Atlantic Center for the Arts, Florida, USA
 Aldeburgh Artist Residency, Suffolk, UK
 Tyrone Guthrie Centre, Ireland

References

External links
 https://www.cmc.ie/composers/ailis-ni-riain
 https://web.archive.org/web/20180810205757/http://www.irishwriters-online.com/ni-riain-ailis/
 https://www.irishtimes.com/culture/music/2022/04/27/ailis-ni-riain-words-and-music-are-things-we-do-against-all-better-judgment-1.4857569/
 https://www.ailis.info/
 http://journalofmusic.com/news/ailis-ni-riain-receives-ps50k-paul-hamlyn-award
 https://www.disabilityartsinternational.org/artists/profiles/ailis-ni-riain/
 http://www.irishplayography.com/person.aspx?personid=41138

1974 births
Living people
21st-century classical composers
21st-century Irish people
Irish classical composers
Irish dramatists and playwrights
Irish women classical composers
Irish women writers
Musicians from County Cork
Yaddo alumni